A gate equivalent (GE) stands for a unit of measure which allows specifying manufacturing-technology-independent complexity of digital electronic circuits.
For today's CMOS technologies, the silicon area of a two-input drive-strength-one NAND gate usually constitutes the technology-dependent unit area commonly referred to as gate equivalent.
A specification in gate equivalents for a certain circuit reflects a complexity measure, from which a corresponding silicon area can be deduced for a dedicated manufacturing technology.

In digital circuit design, a dedicated standard cell library is employed for each manufacturing technology (e.g., CMOS). The standard cell library comprises many different logic gates, for example a NAND gate. For each logical type of logic gate, e.g., a two-input NAND, there usually exist different physical realizations in the standard cell library, for instance with different output drive strengths.

Basically, a two-input drive-strength-one NAND gate in CMOS technology consists of four transistors.

See also 
 Logic family
 NMOS logic
 MOSFET
 Fanout
 FO4
 Boolean logic

References 
 Digital Integrated Circuit Design: From VLSI Architectures to CMOS Fabrication, Hubert Kaeslin, Cambridge University Press, 2008

Logic gates
Equivalent units